Radu Negru may refer to:

 Radu Negru, a mythical Wallachian voivode
 Radu Negru (footballer), Romanian footballer
 Radu Negru, a village in Călineşti Commune, Argeș County, Romania
 Radu Negru, a village in Modelu Commune, Călăraşi County, Romania
 Radu Negru National College, a high school in Făgăraș, Romania